Fritz Preissler (21 June 1908 Hanichen near Reichenberg, Bohemia (now Liberec) - 5 June 1948 in Straubing) was a German-Bohemian luger who competed in the 1920s and 1930s. He won four medals at European luge championships with three golds in the men's singles event (1928, 1929, 1939) and a silver in the men's doubles event (1929).

References
 List of European luge champions 

1908 births
1948 deaths
German Bohemian people
Czechoslovak male lugers
Sportspeople from Liberec
Sudeten German people
Czechoslovak emigrants to Germany